The Valea Sarchii is a left tributary of the Pârâul de Câmpie in Romania. It flows into the Pârâul de Câmpie in Sânger.

References

Rivers of Romania
Rivers of Mureș County